Morgan County is a county located in the U.S. state of West Virginia. As of the 2020 census, the population was 17,063. Its county seat is Berkeley Springs. The county was formed in 1820 from parts of Hampshire and Berkeley Counties and named in honor of General Daniel Morgan, prominent soldier of the American Revolutionary War. The county and town of Bath are considered an excellent jumping off point for exploring the Potomac and Cacapon Rivers valleys just to the north and west. Along with also being a tourist destination hosting numerous local artists, mineral water spas, and a large amount of outdoor recreation that includes fishing, boating, wildlife, hunting, and mountain scenery. The region is known for the famed Apple Butter Festival held annually in October.  Morgan County is also the home of an important silica mine, part of U.S. Silica.

History
Morgan County was created by an act of the Virginia General Assembly in February 1820 from parts of Berkeley and Hampshire counties. It was named in honor of General Daniel Morgan (1736–1802). He was born in Hunterdon County, New Jersey, and moved to Winchester, Virginia as a youth. He served as a wagoner in Braddock's Army during the campaign against the Native Americans in 1755. During the campaign, a British Lieutenant became angry with him and hit him with the flat of his sword. Morgan punched the Lieutenant, knocking him unconscious. Morgan was court-martialed for striking a British officer and was sentenced to 500 lashes. Morgan later joked that the drummer who counted out the lashes miscounted and he received only 499 lashes. For the rest of his life he claimed the British still owed him one.

Early European settlers
The first English settlers in present-day Morgan County arrived during the 1730s. Because most of these early pioneers were squatters, there is no record of their names. Historians claim that the first cabin in the county was built around 1745. As word of the county's warm springs spread eastward, Thomas Fairfax, 6th Lord Fairfax of Cameron decided that the county needed to be surveyed. In 1748, George Washington, then just 16 years old, was part of the survey party that surveyed the Eastern Panhandle region for Lord Fairfax. He later returned to Bath (Berkeley Springs) several times over the next several years with his half-brother, Lawrence, who was ill and hoped that the warm springs might improve his health. The springs, and their rumored medicinal benefits, attracted numerous Native Americans as well as Europeans to the area.

18th century
As mentioned previously, George Washington visited present-day Berkeley Springs several times with his half-brother, Lawrence. When he vacationed in the area in 1767, he noted how busy the town had become. Lord Fairfax had built a summer home there and a "private bath" making the area a popular destination for Virginia's social elite. As the town continued to grow, the Virginia General Assembly decided to formally recognize it. In October 1776, the town was officially named Bath, in honor of England's spa city called Bath. The town's main north–south street was named Washington and the main east–west street was named Fairfax. Also, seven acres (28,000 m2) were set aside for "suffering humanity." When West Virginia gained statehood, that area became West Virginia's first state park.

Bath's population increased during and immediately after the American Revolutionary War as wounded soldiers and others came to the area believing that the warm springs had medicinal qualities. Bath gained a reputation as a somewhat wild town where eating, drinking, dancing, and gambling on the daily horse races were the order of the day.

Bath later became known as Berkeley Springs, primarily because the town's post office took that name (combining Governor Norborne Berkeley's last name with the warm springs found there) to avoid confusion with another post office, located in southeastern Virginia, which was already called Bath. Because the mail was sent to and from Berkeley Springs, that name slowly took precedence.

19th century
Morgan County was one of fifty Virginia counties that were admitted to the Union as the state of West Virginia on June 20, 1863. Later that year, the counties were divided into civil townships, with the intention of encouraging local government. This proved impractical in the heavily rural state, and in 1872 the townships were converted into magisterial districts. Morgan County was divided into six districts: Allen, Bath, Cacapon, Rock Gap, Sleepy Creek, and Timber Ridge. Except for minor adjustments, the historic magisterial districts remained unchanged until the 1980s, when they were consolidated into three new districts: District 1, District 2, and District 3. A District 4 was created in the 1990s, but subsequently discontinued.

20th century
On April 10, 1919, racial violence broke out when the Morgan County race riot was sparked by local business using African-American strikebreakers against local striking white workers. On the same day of the riots one Hugh Ferguson, a Martinsburg African-American, was accused of criminally assaulting Mrs. Ernest Zimmerman at her home near Brosius, Morgan County (now known as Hancock, West Virginia). An angry mob of several hundred men formed around the jail hoping to lynch Ferguson. Sheriff C. R. Hovermale was forced to flee town with Ferguson.

Geography

Major highways
 U.S. Highway 522
 West Virginia Route 9

Adjacent counties
Washington County, Maryland (north)
Berkeley County (east)
Frederick County, Virginia (southeast)
Hampshire County (southwest)
Allegany County, Maryland (northwest)

Rivers and streams
Potomac River
Cacapon River
Cherry Run
Sir Johns Run
Sleepy Creek
Meadow Branch
Warm Spring Run

Demographics

2000 census
As of the census of 2000, there were 14,943 people, 6,145 households, and 4,344 families living in the county. The racial makeup of the county was 98.30% White, 0.60% Black or African American, 0.17% Native American, 0.12% Asian, 0.01% Pacific Islander, 0.23% from other races, and 0.57% from two or more races. 0.83% of the population were Hispanic or Latino of any race.

There were 6,145 households, out of which 28.70% had children under the age of 18 living with them, 57.90% were married couples living together, 8.20% had a female householder with no husband present, and 29.30% were non-families. 24.50% of all households were made up of individuals, and 10.20% had someone living alone who was 65 years of age or older. The average household size was 2.40 and the average family size was 2.84.

The age distribution is 22.40% under the age of 18, 6.80% from 18 to 24, 27.30% from 25 to 44, 26.90% from 45 to 64, and 16.60% who were 65 years of age or older. The median age was 41 years. For every 100 females there were 96.60 males. For every 100 females age 18 and over, there were 95.00 males.

The median income for a household in the county was $35,016, and the median income for a family was $40,690. Males had a median income of $29,816 versus $22,307 for females. The per capita income for the county was $18,109. About 8.00% of families and 10.40% of the population were below the poverty line, including 11.60% of those under age 18 and 8.80% of those age 65 or over.

2010 census
As of the 2010 United States census, there were 17,541 people, 7,303 households, and 5,015 families living in the county. The racial makeup of the county was 97.3% white, 0.6% black or African American, 0.3% Asian, 0.3% Native American, 0.2% from other races, and 1.3% from two or more races. Those of Hispanic or Latino origin made up 1.0% of the population. In terms of ancestry, 27.0% were German, 13.2% were Irish, 11.5% were American, and 10.6% were English.

Of the 7,303 households, 27.8% had children under the age of 18 living with them, 54.1% were married couples living together, 8.9% had a female householder with no husband present, 31.3% were non-families, and 25.7% of all households were made up of individuals. The average household size was 2.39 and the average family size was 2.84. The median age was 45.0 years.

The median income for a household in the county was $37,281 and the median income for a family was $49,974. Males had a median income of $39,372 versus $27,949 for females. The per capita income for the county was $20,732. About 11.9% of families and 15.8% of the population were below the poverty line, including 22.0% of those under age 18 and 10.6% of those age 65 or over.

Government and Public Safety

County Government
Morgan County Commission is a three member elective body. The term of office for each Commission member is six years, with one term expiring every two years.  The current commissioners are Sean Forney - President, Joel Tuttle -Commissioner, and Bill Clark - Commissioner

County Sheriff
The Morgan County Sheriff's Office operates the county jail, provides court protection, provides county building and facility security, and provides patrol and detective services for the county. The current sheriff is K.C. Bohrer after being re-elected for his second term.

County Clerk 
The current county clerk is Kimberly Nickles

County Assessor 
The current assessor is Debbie Weaver

Magistrates 
Morgan County has two Magistrates: Kermit Ambrose and Greg Miller

Politics
Morgan County has historically been a stronghold for the Republican Party. Every Republican presidential nominee has won Morgan County since 1864, the first presidential election following West Virginia's statehood. The last Democratic presidential nominee to win Morgan County was Lewis Cass in 1848; the county was won by the Whig Party, the Know-Nothing Party and John Bell’s Constitutional Union Party in its last three elections as part of Virginia.

Communities

Towns
Berkeley Springs (county seat)
Paw Paw

Magisterial districts

Current
District 1
District 2
District 3

Historic
Allen
Bath
Cacapon
Rock Gap
Sleepy Creek
Timber Ridge
District 4

Census-designated places
Great Cacapon

Unincorporated communities

Berryville
Burnt Factory
Campbells
Cherry Run
Doe Gully
Duckwall
Green Ridge
Greenwood
Hancock (formerly Brosius)
Hansrote
Holton
Jerome
Jimtown
Johnsons Mill
Largent
Lineburg
Magnolia
Mount Trimble
New Hope
North Berkeley
Oakland
Omps
Orleans Cross Roads
Redrock Crossing
Ridersville
Ridge
Rock Gap
Sir Johns Run
Sleepy Creek
Smith Crossroads
Spohrs Crossroads
Stotlers Crossroads
Unger
Woodmont
Woodrow

Historic Places

The following are listed on the National Register of Historic Places:

See also
 Berkeley Springs State Park
 Cacapon Resort State Park
 USS Morgan County (LST-1048)
 Morgan County Observatory with 16 inch quartz glass mirror telescope originally at United States Naval Academy
 National Register of Historic Places listings in Morgan County, West Virginia

Footnotes

References

Bibliography
 - Total pages: 328

Further reading
Fowler, Virginia G. 2002. Brigadier General Daniel Morgan, Washington, D.C.: National Park Service.
Morgan County Historical and Genealogical Society. 1981. Morgan County, West Virginia and Its People. Berkeley Springs: Morgan County Historical and Genealogical Society.
Cartmell, Thomas Kemp. 1909. Shenandoah Valley Pioneers and Their Descendants: A History of Frederick County, Virginia. Winchester, VA: The Eddy Corporation.
Newbraugh, Frederick T. 1967. Warm Springs Echoes: About Berkeley Springs and Morgan County. Part 1: To 1860. Hagerstown, MD: Automated Systems Corporation.
Dr. Robert Jay Dilger, Director, Institute for Public Affairs and Professor of Political Science, West Virginia University.

External links

MorganCountyUSA
Berkeley Springs-Morgan County Chamber of Commerce
Morgan Arts Council
Morgan County Community Organizations
County Public Library
Morgan County Schools
The Morgan Messenger
Morgan County Solid Waste Authority
Morgan County Observatory
WVU Extension Service - Morgan County

 
West Virginia counties on the Potomac River
1820 establishments in Virginia
Populated places established in 1820
Counties of Appalachia